In computing, a management interface is a network interface dedicated to configuration and management operations. Management interfaces are typically connected to dedicated out of band management networks (either VPNs or physical networks), and non-management interfaces are not allowed to carry device or network management traffic. This greatly reduces the attack surface of the managed devices, as external attackers cannot access management functions directly, and thus improves network security.

In some cases, serial ports are used to access the command line interface directly, avoiding transport over a generic network stack completely, providing a further layer of isolation from network attacks.

See also 
 Management plane

Network architecture